Arnaud Brocard (born 19 August 1986 in Dijon) is a French goalkeeper. He previously played in Ligue 2 with RC Lens and Troyes AC in the Championnat National. He made the jump into professional football from the RC Lens youth academy in 2007. Brocard also previously played for Paris FC and Gap.

In August 2011, Brocard joined Ligue 1 side Valenciennes FC as a reserve goalkeeper but could not get chance to play any match.

References

1986 births
Living people
French footballers
Association football goalkeepers
Ligue 2 players
Paris FC players
RC Lens players
ES Troyes AC players
Gap HAFC players
Valenciennes FC players
Sportspeople from Dijon

Championnat National players
Footballers from Bourgogne-Franche-Comté
20th-century French people
21st-century French people